Adrian Carl Thompson (born 26 May 1964) is a British former professional boxer who competed from 1988 to 2005. He held multiple championships at cruiserweight, including the WBO title between 1997 and 1999, and the IBO title twice between 2001 and 2005. Additionally, he held the British title in 1992 and 1999, and the European title in 1994 and 2000. He is also a former Muay Thai fighter, who fought in 1987 and 1989 for World Titles.

Professional career

Early years
Nicknamed "The Cat", Thompson turned professional boxer in 1988. He went 8-0 before losing to Crawford Ashley by TKO in round 6 for the British Central Area light heavyweight title after taking a thumb to the eye. In 1990 he was outpointed by Franco Wanyama, and in 1991 he was KOd by Yawe Davis. However, his punching power in his right hand brought him to contention, stopping the undefeated Nicky Piper in three rounds.

Thompson won the vacant British cruiserweight title by beating Steve Lewsam in eight rounds in June 1992, then in his next fight won the WBC International title in two rounds against Arthur 'Stormy' Weathers at York Hall, Bethnal Green, London in February 1993.

In February 1994, Thompson traveled to Ferrara, Emilia Romagna, Italy and won the European title by defeating Massimiliano Duran by KO in eight rounds, and in his next bout knocked out France's Akim Tafer in six rounds at Epernay, Marne, France to retain his European title.

After winning two mark-time fights, Thompson was matched against Ralf Rocchigiani in a bout for the vacant WBO cruiserweight title at the G-Mex Leisure Centre, Manchester in June 1995. Both fighters were knocked down in round five, and Thompson lost during round eleven after dislocating his shoulder.

WBO cruiserweight champion
After returning with three wins, Thompson won the WBO cruiserweight title via decision over Ralf Rocchigiani in a rematch in Stadionsporthalle, Hannover, Niedersachsen, Germany in October 1997. He defended the belt twice, beating the smaller Chris Eubank in 1998 before losing it via a controversial referee stoppage to Johnny Nelson in 1999.

Thompson regained the vacant British title with a twelfth round knockout of Terry Dunstan in December 1999, then regained the vacant European title with a sixth round stoppage of Alain Simon.
  
Thompson's winning streak ended in a fourth round knockout defeat to Ezra Sellers in 2001.

Thompson vs. Rothman 
After three low-key wins, Thompson met South African, Sebastian Rothman. Thompson had been on the end of beating for most of the bout. The BBC commentators on the night, Jim Neilly and Colin McMillan, were calling for Carl's retirement, saying he was finished, taking the beating needlessly, and that the fight should have been stopped.

Rothman forced Thompson on to the ropes during the ninth round and the referee looked at Thompson ready to stop the fight. Somehow Thompson got away from the ropes and forced Rothman into the middle of the ring. With 17 seconds remaining in the round, Rothman dropped his left hand for what seemed like a fraction of a second, allowing Carl to deliver a flush right hand to the South African's head knocking him to the canvas.

Rothman bravely tried to get back on his feet but his legs had gone and the referee had no option but to stop the fight, handing Thompson a famous victory.

Thompson vs. Haye
In September 2004 at 40 years of age, Thompson boxed the up-and-coming 23 year old David Haye in a classic 'youth vs experience' matchup. Haye started fast and caught Thompson with constant barrages of power punches, coming close to forcing a stoppage at numerous points over the first few rounds.

Gradually, despite the early punishment he received, Thompson warmed up and worked his way into the fight whilst Haye seemed to tire and slow down. Thompson began to pressure Haye and knocked Haye down with a chopping right hand in round five. With seven seconds left in the round, Thompson landed two jabs followed by a flush right hand which rocked a fatigued Haye, and compelled Haye's corner to throw in the towel.

Thompson retired at the end of 2005 after a points win over Frederic Serrat.

Professional boxing record

References

External links

1964 births
Living people
Boxers from Manchester
Cruiserweight boxers
World Boxing Organization champions
English male boxers
Black British sportsmen
English people of Nigerian descent
Light-heavyweight boxers
International Boxing Organization champions
European Boxing Union champions
World cruiserweight boxing champions
British Boxing Board of Control champions